TNL TV is an English and Sinhala-language television station in Sri Lanka, owned by Telshan Network. Launched in 1993, TNL TV was one of Sri Lanka's first privately owned television channels. Shan Wickremesinghe, the chairman of Telshan Network, is the brother of Prime Minister Ranil Wickremesinghe.

The first television broadcast dedicated for teledramas, CTV began telecast from February 1, 2008 from 10 am to 1 pm on weekdays and from 10 am to 4 pm on Saturday.

Broadcasting 
TNL TV is available on free-to-air analog terrestrial transmission on the following channels:

 VHF:
 3 (Piliyandela, Polgahawela)
 4 (Nuwara Eliya)
 11 (Karagatenna)
 UHF:
 21 (Badulla, Bambalapitiya)
 26 (Hantana, Gongala, Ratnapura)

The transmitter at Polgahawela was seized in 2018 by the Telecommunications Regulatory Commission of Sri Lanka for illegal operation, including on two frequencies. While it had obtained provincial approval for the operation, the TRC had not approved on the federal level.

TNL TV is available via satellite on Dialog TV (channel 11) and Dish TV (channel 2511). It is also available on Lanka Broadband Networks cable TV and PEO TV IPTV (channel 13).

Cricket broadcasting
The first hosted broadcast was for the 2016 Asia Cup tournament from 24 February 2016 to 6 March 2016.

References

External links
 

1993 establishments in Sri Lanka
English-language television stations in Sri Lanka
Sinhala-language television stations
Television channels and stations established in 1993
Telshan Networks